Dembidolo Airport  is an airport in Dembidolo, Oromia Region, Ethiopia,  from Dembidolo town. 

Ethiopian Construction Works, Corporation Transport Infrastructure Construction Sector constructed the airport in asphalt and concrete at a cost of more than 176.7 million birr. The project included a runway, apron field, taxiway and stripway, and was completed in June 2018.

Airlines and destinations

Passenger

References

External links
 OurAirports - Ethiopia
  Great Circle Mapper - Dembidollo
 Dembidollo
Ethiopian Airlines routes

Airports in Ethiopia
Oromia Region